Stanley Cross may refer to:

Stanley Cross (executioner), English executioner
Stan Cross, Australian political cartoonist